John "Jack" Skahan (born February 7, 1998) is an American professional soccer player who plays as a midfielder for Major League Soccer club San Jose Earthquakes.

Career

Youth, College & Amateur
Skahan played with the Philadelphia Union academy, and later as an amateur player in the National Premier Soccer League with Memphis City FC.

Skahan went on to play four years of college soccer at the University of North Carolina at Chapel Hill between 2016 and 2019, making a total of 71 appearances, scoring 12 goals and tallying 12 assists.

While at college, Skahan appeared for USL League Two sides Wilmington Hammerheads, San Francisco City FC and North Carolina FC U23.

Professional
Skahan was selected by the San Jose Earthquakes with the 27th pick in the second round of the 2020 MLS SuperDraft. In February 2020, the Earthquakes signed Skahan to a multi-year contract.

References

External links
Jack Skahan at University of North Carolina Athletics

1998 births
Living people
American soccer players
Association football midfielders
Memphis City FC players
National Premier Soccer League players
North Carolina FC U23 players
North Carolina Tar Heels men's soccer players
Reno 1868 FC players
San Francisco City FC players
San Jose Earthquakes draft picks
San Jose Earthquakes players
Soccer players from Memphis, Tennessee
USL Championship players
USL League Two players
Wilmington Hammerheads FC players
Major League Soccer players
MLS Next Pro players